Mikhaylovka is a rural locality (a selo) and the administrative center of Mikhaylovsky Selsoviet of Blagoveshchensky District, Amur Oblast, Russia. The population was 587 as of 2018. There are 13 streets.

Geography 
Mikhaylovka is located near the left bank of the Amur River, 51 km north of Blagoveshchensk (the district's administrative centre) by road. Gryaznushka is the nearest rural locality.

References 

Rural localities in Blagoveshchensky District, Amur Oblast